Saturday Night with Miriam was a televised talk show first broadcast on RTÉ One in the summer of 2005. The show runs for six weeks as a summer filler, and is overseen by Miriam O'Callaghan, a co-presenter of Prime Time.

Format
Saturday Night with Miriam, airs during summer months on RTÉ One when programmes such as The Late Late Show and the former Saturday night talk show Tubridy Tonight are off air. The show has a wide variety of guests, often including musicians, who usually perform on the show. The Duckworth Lewis Method made their television debut on Saturday Night with Miriam in 2009's season opener.

History
The first two series were pre-recorded show was broadcast on Saturday nights after the main evening news, lasting approximately 60 minutes. In the 2007 series, the programme began to broadcast live.

The show's first guests included Charlie McCreevy, Paul Brady, D. J. Carey and Ray D'Arcy. The programme received thirty-six percent of the adult audience.

The series was also run in summer 2006 and a third series ran in 2007.

The fourth series in 2008 was very popular and achieved a forty percent audience . People such as Mary Coughlan, Enda Kenny, Cherie Blair and Jade Goody appeared on the series.

In 2009, the series returned for a fifth series, with RTÉ making the announcement on 4 June 2009. This happened after it was announced that she would not be the new host of The Late Late Show. O'Callaghan also got her first radio programme, filling in for Eamon Dunphy on Miriam Meets.... Newly elected politician George Lee was one of the first guests of the fifth series. The final episode of the fifth series received 422,000 viewers, a 35% audience share.

O'Callaghan confirmed that the series would return in 2013.

The show returned in the summer of 2014 for another series, running from 5 July until 23 August 2014 on RTÉ One. The 2014 season was pre-recorded on Fridays.

The show returned in the summer of 2015 for another series commencing 20 June 2015 and ran until 8 August 2015 on RTÉ One.

In 2018 Miriam announced that the show would take a break and would not return for a new series in 2018. This was down to the busy schedule Miriam had for the summer of 2018, with the then upcoming coverage on RTÉ  of the referendum on abortion, coverage of Pope Francis visit to Ireland and Miriam's involvement in a documentary.  However she did say in an interview with the RTÉ Guide that the show would return in the summer of 2019.

In May 2019, it was confirmed that Saturday Night with Miriam would not be returning to the RTÉ One schedules that autumn, as Miriam would be filling in for Seán O'Rourke on his RTÉ Radio 1 mid-morning show during the summer.

Guests

Series 3

Series 4
The 2008 series got an average viewing audience of 425,000.

Series 5

References

External links
 Miriam at RTÉ Television
 

2005 Irish television series debuts
Irish television talk shows
RTÉ original programming